John Burton Hotchkiss (August 22, 1845 – November 3, 1922) was an American football coach and professor. He was deaf since the age of 9, and attended Gallaudet University, where later he was the first coach of the Gallaudet Bison football team. He is the namesake of their football field. Hotchkiss was also a writer; one of the founders and editors of the Silent World, a short-lived paper for the deaf. Hotchkiss taught English and history.

Early years
Hotchkiss became deaf due to meningitis or scarlet fever. He attended the American School for the Deaf in Hartford, the first permanent school for the deaf in the country.

References

External links
Memories of Old Hartford, Hotchkiss on video

1845 births
1922 deaths
Gallaudet Bison football coaches
People from Seymour, Connecticut
Coaches of American football from Washington, D.C.
American deaf people